Debbie Thompson (July 5, 1942 – November 17, 2019) was an American sprinter. She competed in the women's 200 metres at the 1964 Summer Olympics.

References

External links
 

1942 births
2019 deaths
Athletes (track and field) at the 1964 Summer Olympics
American female sprinters
Olympic track and field athletes of the United States
Sportspeople from Frederick, Maryland
Track and field athletes from Maryland
USA Indoor Track and Field Championships winners
21st-century American women